Statistics of Swedish football Division 2 in season 1979.

League standings

Norra

Södra

References
Sweden - List of final tables (Clas Glenning)

Swedish Football Division 2 seasons
2
Sweden
Sweden